Joseph Frank Wehner (20 September 1895 – 18 September 1918), also known as Fritz Wehner, was an American fighter pilot and wingman to Frank Luke.

Early life
Wehner was born in Roxbury, Massachusetts on 20 September 1895. Wehner's athletic achievements as captain of the Everett High School football team earned him a scholarship to the  Phillips Exeter Academy in Exeter, New Hampshire in 1914. He was working for the YMCA in Berlin, Germany when war was declared. He enlisted in the Signal Corps during June 1917.

Aerial service
While receiving flight training, Wehner's German ancestry led to an investigation followed by an unsubstantiated arrest for suspicion of treason by the Secret Service. He was cleared and departed for England in February 1918. He was assigned to the 27th Aero Squadron under Major Harold Hartney in July 1918.

Flying as wing man to the mercurial balloon-buster Frank Luke, Wehner shot down one Fokker D.VII and five balloons in just three days of aerial combat during September 1918.

Protecting Luke as he attacked a third balloon, Wehner's SPAD XIII was shot down by Luftstreitkräfte ace Georg von Hantelmann of Jasta 15 on 18 September 1918. Wehner, who fell behind enemy lines, was taken to a German hospital where he died a short time later from his injuries. His body was recovered and buried in an American cemetery in Europe after the war, but it was reinterred in his hometown of Everett, Massachusetts in 1921.

He was awarded the Distinguished Service Cross, America's second highest award for combat valor, twice.

Honors and awards
Distinguished Service Cross (DSC)

The Distinguished Service Cross is presented to Joseph Frank Wehner, First Lieutenant (Air Service), U.S. Army, for extraordinary heroism in action near Rouvres, France, September 15, 1918. While on a mission First Lieutenant Wehner found an enemy patrol of eight machines attacking a single American observation machine. He immediately attacked, destroying one and forcing another down out of control, his own plane being badly damaged by enemy machine-gun fire. He managed to convey the American plane to safety.
 
Distinguished Service Cross (DSC) with Oak Leaf Cluster
The Distinguished Service Cross is presented to Joseph Frank Wehner, First Lieutenant (Air Service), U.S. Army, for extraordinary heroism in action near Mangiennes and Reville, France, September 16, 1918. Amid terrific antiaircraft and ground machine-gun fire First Lieutenant Wehner descended, attacked, and destroyed two enemy balloons. One of these balloons was destroyed in flames after it had been hauled to the ground and was resting in its bed.

See also

 List of World War I flying aces from the United States

References

Bibliography
 American Aces of World War I. Norman Franks, Harry Dempsey. Osprey Publishing, 2001. , .

External links
July 14, 2008 - 90th anniversary Commemoration of United States Air Service in France
 J.F Wehner at Find a Grave

1895 births
1918 deaths
American World War I flying aces
Aviators from Massachusetts
United States Army officers
American military personnel killed in World War I
Recipients of the Distinguished Service Cross (United States)
Phillips Exeter Academy alumni
People from Roxbury, Boston
American people of German descent
Military personnel from Massachusetts